Donald Ferguson Brown (June 30, 1903 – October 8, 1959) was a Canadian politician, barrister and lawyer. He was born in Petrolia, Ontario, Canada. He was elected to the House of Commons of Canada as a Member of the Liberal Party in the 1945 election to represent the riding of Essex West. He was re-elected in the elections of 1949, 1953, 1957 and defeated in the election of 1958. During his federal political career, he was a member of various committees including: Chairperson of the Special Committee appointed to consider Bill no. 305 : An act respecting immigration, Co-Chair of the Joint Committee on Capital and Corporal Punishment and Lotteries and a member of the Joint Committee on Old Age Security. He died in 1959.

References

External links
 

1903 births
1959 deaths
Liberal Party of Canada MPs
Members of the House of Commons of Canada from Ontario